Bishan Singh s/o Ram Singh (May 31, 1944 - November 29, 2006) was a Malaysian social activist and environmentalist.

Background
Born in Nibong Tebal, Penang, Bishan Singh had a Masters in Development Management from the Asian Institute of Management, Manila. He graduated as a Dean Scholar. His journey had been meaningful as he did not have a bachelor's degree. 

Bishan Singh spearheaded a campaign to save Tasik Chini, a famous lake in Pahang which is also Malaysia's largest freshwater lake, and received strong support from the private sector. To him, the lake was special in many ways and had been in love with the lake since his secondary school days and wanted it to be revived.

Bishan Singh was president of Fomca and the Pahang Consumers Association. He also served as a Kuantan municipal councillor for a few terms. During his presidency of the Pahang Consumers Association, he and his team build it to be the largest consumer association in the World. 

He held the presidency of the Sustainable Development Network and was a board member of the Pesticide Action Network, Asia Pacific.

He had offered his services in consultancy for more than 20 years in 22 countries.

His efforts did not go unnoticed and he was the first recipient of the Consumer Advocate Award, and most recently was named the recipient of Langkawi Award by the Yang di-Pertuan Agong.

Death
Bishan Singh died at 6.43am at the Tengku Ampuan Afzan Hospital on November 29, 2006, aged 62; the cause of death was listed as pulmonary embolism.

His wife Mary Wai, 66, and children Sunitha, 35, and Jeevan Ram, 33, were by his side. Fomca secretary-general Muhammad Sha'ani Abdullah described Singh's death as a “great loss to the nation and NGO community”.

References

1944 births
2006 deaths
Malaysian environmentalists
Malaysian people of Indian descent
Malaysian people of Punjabi descent
Malaysian Sikhs
People from Penang
Deaths from pulmonary embolism
Asian Institute of Management alumni